Borate glasses have a more complex action of alkali ions than silicate glasses. Borate glasses also have major differences in their optical properties.

The single largest use of boron compounds in the world (accounting for half of total global use) is the production of certain types of boron-treated glass fiber for insulating and structural fiberglass. In these uses the boron may be present as borax or boron oxide, and adds to the structural strength of the glass as borosilicate, or is added as a fluxing agent to decrease the melting temperature of pure silica, which is difficult to extrude as fibers and work with in pure form, due to the high temperatures involved.

References

Glass